Anri Enverovich Khagush (born 23 September 1986) is a Russian football coach and former player (right-back). He is of Abkhazian descent and has represented his nation at the international level.

Club career
Khagush was born in Abkhazia and started his career as part of Spartak Moscow 's youth system. He joined BATE Borisov in the summer of 2006 and became an integral part of the first team during the 2007 season. Khagush was one of the important players for BATE Borisov during the 2008/2009 season, helping them reach the group stage of the Champions League for the first time in their history. He played in 5 of the Belarusians' Champions League games. On 17 September 2008, he was sent off after receiving a second yellow card in away game against Real Madrid, which ended in a 0:2 loss. He was signed by FC Rubin Kazan at the start of 2009 season. He was immediately loaned out to Kuban Krasnodar. In the years 2010-2011 he played on loan for Rostov. Khagush returned to BATE Borisov in 2014.

Career statistics

Club

References

External links
 

1986 births
Living people
People from Gagra District
Footballers from Abkhazia
Russian footballers
Russia under-21 international footballers
Russian expatriate footballers
Expatriate footballers in Belarus
FC BATE Borisov players
FC Kuban Krasnodar players
Russian Premier League players
FC Rostov players
PFC Spartak Nalchik players
FC Torpedo-BelAZ Zhodino players
Russian people of Abkhazian descent
Association football defenders
FC Arsenal Tula players
FC Spartak Moscow players
FC Rubin Kazan players
FC Neftekhimik Nizhnekamsk players
FC Spartak Nizhny Novgorod players